Church Bay is a bay  wide, indenting the north coast of South Georgia between Low Rock Point and Cape North. It is separated from Schlieper Bay by the Scree Gap.

It was roughly charted by Discovery Investigations personnel in the period 1925–30 and surveyed by the South Georgia Survey, 1951–57. The name is well established in local use.

References 

Bays of South Georgia